Chris Allen may refer to:
Chris Allen (academic) (born 1966), British sociologist
Chris Allen (footballer, born 1972), English football player
Chris Allen (footballer, born 1989), English football player 
Chris Allen (ice hockey) (born 1978), Canadian ice hockey defenceman
Chris Allen (skier) (born 1959), Australian Olympic skier
Chris W. Allen (born 1956), University of Nebraska in Omaha academic
Chris Allen (author) (born 1964), Australian novelist
 Chris Allen (born 1952), vocalist with The Troggs
Chris Allen, founding member of the band Shadowkeep

See also
Kris Allen (born 1985), 2009 American Idol winner
Christopher Allen (disambiguation)
Allen (surname)